Theodoric I (ca. 1045 – 2 January 1105) was a Count of Montbéliard, Count of Bar and lord of Mousson (as Theodoric II) and Count of Verdun. He was the son of Louis, Count of Montbéliard, and Sophie, Countess of Bar and Lady of Mousson.

After his father's death, he claimed the estate of the Duchy of Lorraine, which his father had already claimed. The claim was dismissed by Emperor Henry IV, confirming the duchy to Theodoric the Valiant. In retaliation, he ravaged the diocese of Metz, but he was defeated by Adalbéron III, bishop of Metz, and the Duke of Lorraine Theodoric the Valiant. Reconciled with the Church, he founded an abbey in 1074 in Haguenau and rebuilt the church at Montbéliard in 1080. He did not participate at the Council of Clermont in 1095, or the Crusades, but rather sent his son Louis in the Crusades. In 1100, the Bishop of Verdun gave the county to Thierry for life, but the relationship between the spiritual and temporal powers was turbulent.

In 1065 Theodoric married Ermentrude of Burgundy (1055–1105), daughter of William I, Count of Burgundy, and Stephanie. They had the following issue:

Theodoric II (1081–1163), Count of Montbéliard
Louis, who became a crusader, returned in 1102 and was assassinated in 1103
Frederick I († 1160), Count of Ferrette and Altkirch
Reginald I (1090–1150), Count of Bar and lord of Mousson
Stephen (†1162), bishop of Metz
William, who died before 1105
Hugh, cited in 1105, probably religious, because he did not share his father's possessions
Gunthilde (†1131), abbess of Biblisheim
Agnes, married in 1104 (†1136)

References

Sources

Georges Poull, La Maison souveraine et ducale de Bar, 1994

House of Montbelliard
Counts of Montbéliard
Theodoric II
Counts of Verdun
Lords of Mousson
1040s births
1105 deaths